The 1987 Colorado State Rams football team represented Colorado State University in the Western Athletic Conference during the 1987 NCAA Division I-A football season. In their sixth season under head coach Leon Fuller, the Rams compiled a 1–11 record.

Schedule

References

Colorado State
Colorado State Rams football seasons
Colorado State Rams football